Arkoff is a surname. Notable people with the surname include:

Lou Arkoff, American film producer, son of Samuel
Samuel Z. Arkoff (1918–2001), American film producer

See also
Arkoff International Pictures, American film production company